Undefined may refer to:

Mathematics
 Undefined (mathematics), with several related meanings
 Indeterminate form, in calculus

Computing
 Undefined behavior, computer code whose behavior is not specified under certain conditions
 Undefined value, a condition where an expression does not have a correct value
 Undefined variable 
 Undefined, a function or variable lacking a declaration
 Undefined, a variable lacking initialization
 Undefined, an unavailable linker symbol (function, or global variable)

Other uses
 Undefined, something that lacks any definition
 Undefined citizenship, a post-Soviet form of statelessness in Estonia

See also
 Null (disambiguation)
 Void (disambiguation)
 Invalid (disambiguation)
 Definition (disambiguation)
 Definable (disambiguation)